Papiliocellulus elegans is a species of diatom.

References 

 Papiliocellulus elegans at WoRMS

Cymatosirales
Species described in 1983